Guitars a là Lee is a 1966 album by the American singer Peggy Lee.

Track listing
"Nice 'n' Easy" (Alan Bergman, Marilyn Keith, Lew Spence) - 3:08
"Strangers in the Night" (Bert Kaempfert, Charles Singleton, Eddie Snyder) - 2:28 	
"Mohair Sam" (Dallas Frazier) - 2:10
"Goodbye, My Love" (Peggy Lee, Victor Young) - 2:56
"Think Beautiful" (Jack Lawrence, Stan Freeman) - 2:27
"An Empty Glass" (Luiz Bonfá, Dick Manning) - 2:50
"Good Times" (Hugo, George David Weiss) - 2:36
"Sweet Happy Life" (Antonio Maria, Luiz Bonfá, Norman Gimbel) - 2:09
"Touch the Earth" (Jeri Southern, Gail Allen) - 2:30
"Beautiful, Beautiful World" (Sheldon Harnick, Jerry Bock) - 2:37
"My Guitar" (Peggy Lee) - 2:49
"Call Me" (Tony Hatch) - 2:34

References

1966 albums
Capitol Records albums
Peggy Lee albums
Albums produced by Dave Cavanaugh